Kendriya Vidyalaya Ernakulam is a school in Kadavanthra, Kochi in the state of Kerala, India.

History
Kendriya Vidyalaya Ernakulam is part of a system of central government schools under the Ministry of Human Resource Development of India. The system came into being in 1965 as "Central Schools", and has been affiliated to CBSE since then. It catered for children of defence force personnel who were often posted to remote places. With the army starting its own public schools, the service was extended (but not restricted to) to all central government employees. The uniform curriculum followed by these schools all over India ensured that the children of government employees do not face educational difficulties when their parents are transferred to other parts of the country. The name was later changed from "Central School" to "Kendriya Vidyalaya".

There are 981 Kendriya Vidyalayas at present, including four outside India. They have 1,018,581 students (as of 30 September 2008) and 48,262 employees (as of 1 March 2009). These schools have been divided into 21 regions each headed by an Assistant Commissioner. The Kendriya Vidyalaya Sangathan (Central School Organization) oversees the schools.

Location
This Kendriya Vidyalaya is located in Gandhi Nagar, Kadavanthra, Kochi. The current principal is Mr.Surendran and there are more than 2500 students. The school buildings are divided into two blocks, the original building and the new block which was inaugurated in July 2009. Kendriya Vidyalaya Ernakulam is one of the best Kendriya Vidyalayas in Kerala.

School organisation
The school has up to 12 grades with four sections: A, B, C and D. Apart from the formal classes, the students take part in co-curricular activities, sports and games, club activities, work experience, Scouts and Girl Guides, computer education, vocational training and adventure programmes.

The students have been divided into four groups or houses: Ashoka, Shivaji, Raman and Tagore. The co-curricular activities are conducted along house lines. At the end of the academic year, the house with the most points is declared the winner. The trophy is awarded to the captains of the house by the chief guest at the Annual Day Celebrations.

See also
List of schools in Ernakulam
Kendriya Vidyalaya No. 2 AFA, Dundigal
List of Kendriya Vidyalayas

References

Kendriya Vidyalayas in Kerala
High schools and secondary schools in Kochi
Educational institutions established in 1965
1965 establishments in Kerala